Coralie Frei (born October 12, 1951) is a Comorian nurse and writer currently living in Switzerland.  She is the first Comorian woman to write a novel, and has also written poetry.

Born in Ouani, she began her studies in her native town before continuing them in Mutsamudu and at the Lycée Saïd Mohamed Cheik in Moroni. After obtaining a baccalaureat in philosophy in 1973, she married, but it did not last, and she travelled to France for further study and to seek a divorce.  Frei continued her studies, in English and Spanish, at the Universities of Toulouse and Pau, and remarried there. Upon receiving her degree in Pau, she chose instead to take a nurse's diploma.  She raised five children during this time, and is a grandmother. She has written throughout her life, producing poetry as well as fiction; she writes in both French and German.  She has published six books and two CDs, and some of her poetry has been set to music.

Works
Frei's works include:
La perle des Comores
L'autre côté de l'océan
Le journal de Maya. Confidences d'un chat

References

External links
Author's webpage

1951 births
Living people
Comorian women writers
Comorian novelists
Comorian poets
Women novelists
Comorian women poets
20th-century poets
20th-century women writers
21st-century poets
21st-century novelists
21st-century women writers
Comorian nurses
People from Anjouan
Comorian expatriates in Switzerland
University of Toulouse alumni
Comorian writers in French
German-language writers
Comorian expatriates in France